The Right Size was a British theatre company active from 1988 to 2006, led by Sean Foley and Hamish McColl.  Their major success was The Play What I Wrote, a tribute to Morecambe and Wise, and other key productions included Do You Come Here Often? and Ducktastic.

Early years
Foley and McColl have frequently been reported as saying that they met in Paris around 1987 when they were learning to be clowns at the school of Philippe Gaulier (with both leaving after a month when they ran out of money). But it seems more likely they met earlier at Oxford Youth Theatre. They formed The Right Size in January 1988. The name arose when working on their first show, which was originally titled The Right Size. When they decided to change the name of that show to Que Sera, they kept The Right Size as their company name. McColl said this was because they "liked everybody's aspirations to be the right size."

From their earliest shows, such as Que Sera, The Bath, Flight to Finland and Moose, The Right Size often tried out productions at the Edinburgh Festival Fringe or London International Mime Festival, and then toured in the UK, Europe and internationally, sometimes in collaboration with the British Council. The shows were devised by Foley and McColl with their collaborating co-performers and creative team. "I grew up by creating my own work," Foley said later. "Nobody was going to give me a job, so I created one myself by creating a theatre company, The Right Size. On the first show my partner, Hamish McColl, and I built the set, drove the van, did the show, took the set out, went to the pub."

They were described early on in terms such as "one of Britain's most promising young clown theatre companies" and "[t]he multilingual clowning theatre company [that] specialises in brash physical comedy that is part mime, part slapstick and can just about be traced back to the traditions of the commedia dell'arte". McColl, commenting later on 1980s trends in "physical theatre" based around schools such as those of Philippe Gaulier and Jacques Lecoq in Paris, said, "The difference for us is that we hitched ourselves more to vaudeville and variety. We like to see ourselves as much in that tradition as in the explosion from France."

Double act focus
From 1994 and Stop Calling Me Vernon, Foley and McColl focused on working as a double act.  "We'd always had other people in our shows," Foley recalled. "This was the first time we said, 'I tell you what, let's just do two weeks' rehearsal, just the two of us, and see what we come up with.' And when we put it up in front of an audience, they laughed their socks off. That's when we found that we were a double-act." Stop Calling Me Vernon was about a fading vaudeville duo, practicing their old gags whilst waiting for their next big break.

Their major 1997 success Do You Come Here Often? was about two strangers stuck in a bathroom for 25 years.  The show was inspired by the experiences of Beirut hostages Brian Keenan and John McCarthy.

The Play What I Wrote and Ducktastic

The Right Size achieved major UK and international success with The Play What I Wrote.  Their final play together was 2005's Ducktastic, a satire on Siegfried and Roy, but with performing ducks instead of tigers.

Collaborators and influences
Foley and McColl were loyal collaborators with others, working consistently with behind-the-scenes partners over the years including director Jozef Houben, from 1991-2001, designer Alice Power, from 1991-2006 and songwriter Chris Larner, from 1992-2000. Through these collaborators, and others such as co-performer Micheline Vandepoel, The Right Size have links to physical theatre companies such as Complicite and Spymonkey.

The duo have regularly credited vaudeville legend Johnny Hutch as an inspiration.

Productions
Productions were generally devised, written and performed in by Foley and McColl.

TV
 Foley & McColl: This Way Up, 2005

Radio
 The Remains of Foley and McColl, 2000

References

External links
The Right Size fit the bill
Sunday Times, October 2005

Edinburgh Festival performers
British comedy duos
English male comedians